Edwyn Burnaby may refer to:

Edwyn Burnaby (courtier) (1798–1867), English landowner, Justice of the Peace, Deputy Lieutenant, and High Sheriff of Leicestershire
Edwyn Burnaby (politician) (1830–1883), his son, an English major general and Member of Parliament for Leicestershire North